Zaliznychnyi District may refer to the following urban districts in Ukraine:

Zaliznychnyi District, Lviv
Zaliznychnyi District, Simferopol

See also
Russian equivqlent of 'Zaliznychnyi' (which means 'Railway') is 'Zheleznodorozhny(disambiguation)'